David Durmaz (born 21 December 1981) is a Swedish-Assyrian footballer who plays as a defender for Assyriska FF.

Durmaz, of Assyrian origin from southeastern Turkey, also holds Turkish citizenship. He is a relative of Jimmy Durmaz.

Durmaz played for various Swedish clubs before departing from his club Malmö FF to Turkish club Denizlispor in summer 2009. However, there was much trouble surrounding the transfer which resulted in a lack of play time for Durmaz who later left the club in winter 2009. Back in Sweden Durmaz joined newly promoted Syrianska FC and played for them until the 2012 season when he joined local rivals Assyriska Föreningen.

References

External links
 GAIS profile 
 

1981 births
Living people
GAIS players
Malmö FF players
Assyrian footballers
Swedish footballers
Denizlispor footballers
Syrianska FC players
Assyriska FF players
Ljungskile SK players
Allsvenskan players
Superettan players
Swedish people of Assyrian/Syriac descent
Swedish people of Turkish descent
Turkish people of Assyrian descent
Syriac Orthodox Christians
Association football defenders